Chrysolina cinctipennis is a species of leaf beetles in Chrysomelidae family.

Distribution
It lives near the basin Danube, in the Northeast Europe and Central Asia.

References

Chrysomelinae
Beetles described in 1874
Beetles of Europe
Taxa named by Edgar von Harold